Carlos Anibal Altamirano Argüello (13 March 1942 – 25 September 2015) was an Ecuadorian Catholic bishop.

He was born in Aloasí and ordained a priest in 1966. He served only the archdiocese of Quito until 1994, when he was named to the concurrent post of titular bishop in Ambia. Altamirano was appointed as the bishop of Azogues in 2004, and died in office in 2015.

References

1942 births
2015 deaths
20th-century Roman Catholic bishops in Ecuador
21st-century Roman Catholic bishops in Ecuador
Roman Catholic bishops of Azogues
Roman Catholic bishops of Quito